Gommenec'h is a commune in the Côtes-d'Armor department of Brittany in northwestern France.

Population

Inhabitants are called gommenechois in French.

Etymology
Breton Etymology: gou (under) and menec'h (monks)

Geography - Economy

Hamlets: Kerampalier, Kerbalan, Kerbillion-Bihan, Kerdoret, Kerdouanec, Kerhuel, Kerilis,  Villepierre, Pors-Hamonet, Kervenou, Kermovezen, Kervernier, kerbars, Kerolland, Kergaff, Kerloas, Kerien, Kervily, Kerbost, Guern-Bras, le Guily, la Ville-Basse, la Trinité, Lochrist, Traou-Morvan, Traou-Gouziou, Traou-Hamon, Traou-Bistihou.

Gommenec'h is surrounded by four rivers: le Leff, le Gouazel, le Roz and le Goas Mab.

Sights
The chapel of Douannec dating from the sixteenth century, with statues of the Virgin and Child, Saint Pierre, and Saint Eutrope in polychrome wood.

The church of Saint Guy with a wooden statue of Saint Joran.

The fountain of Saint Guy: eighteenth century granite fountain.

See also
Communes of the Côtes-d'Armor department

References

External links

Official website 

Communes of Côtes-d'Armor